is a railway station on the Rinkai Line in Kōtō, Tokyo, Japan, operated by Tokyo Waterfront Area Rapid Transit (TWR). The station serves the Tokyo Big Sight exhibition centre, after which the station is named.

Lines

Services

Station layout
The station has a single underground island platform serving two tracks.

Chest-height platform edge doors are scheduled to be installed on the platform during fiscal 2018.

History
The station opened on 30 March 1996.

Station numbering was introduced in 2016 with Shinonome being assigned station number R03.

Passenger statistics
In fiscal 2014, the station was used by an average of 33,308 passengers daily (boarding passengers only), making it the third busiest station on the Rinkai Line, after Osaki and Oimachi.

Surrounding area
 Ariake Station (Yurikamome)
 Tokyo Big Sight
 Panasonic Centre Tokyo
 Japanese Foundation For Cancer Research Hospital
 Tokyo Fashion Town ("TFT")
 Ariake Coliseum
Musashino University

Hotels
 Tokyo Bay Ariake Washington Hotel
 Hotel Sunroute Ariake

See also
 List of railway stations in Japan

References

External links

 Kokusai-Tenjijō Station information (TWR) 

Railway stations in Japan opened in 1996
TWR Rinkai Line
Stations of Tokyo Waterfront Area Rapid Transit
Railway stations in Tokyo